The Surface Transportation and Uniform Relocation Assistance Act of 1987 (Pub. L. 100–17, 101 Stat. 132) is a United States Act of Congress, containing in Title I, the Federal-Aid Highway Act of 1987.

History
The bill was introduced in House by Glenn Anderson (D-CA) on January 6, 1987. 
The bill nominally gave power to apportion money to the Secretary of Transportation.

It was followed by the Intermodal Surface Transportation Efficiency Act (ISTEA). The local agencies (counties and cities) in California were assured that an equal or not less amount of monies will still be annually apportioned to the counties and cities as they received in 1990–91 under the Federal Highway Act of 1987 under the old Federal Aid Urban (FAU) and Federal Aid Secondary Program.

References

External links
 Surface Transportation and Uniform Relocation Assistance Act of 1987 (PDF/details) as amended in the GPO Statute Compilations collection

1987 in law
United States federal transportation legislation